The 2016 South American Basketball Championship was the 47th edition of the FIBA South American Basketball Championship. Ten teams were featured in the competition, which were held in Caracas, Venezuela from June 26 – July 2, 2016. The top five teams qualified for the 2017 FIBA AmeriCup and the top seven teams qualified for Division A of the 2019 FIBA Basketball World Cup qualification.

Venezuela won its second consecutive South American championship by beating Brazil in the final, 64–58.

Participating teams 
  (Hosts, defending champions)

Squads

Preliminary round
The draw was held on 21 April 2016.

Group A

Group B

Final round

Semifinals

Seventh place game

Fifth place game

Third place game

Final

Final rankings 
The top five teams qualified for the 2017 FIBA AmeriCup and the top seven teams qualified for Division A of the 2019 FIBA Basketball World Cup qualification.

References

External links
 FIBA

South American Basketball Championship
2016–17 in South American basketball
2016 in Venezuelan sport
International basketball competitions hosted by Venezuela
Sports competitions in Caracas
21st century in Caracas
June 2016 sports events in South America
July 2016 sports events in South America